Tiangong-1 was China's first prototype space station. It orbited Earth from September 2011 to April 2018, serving as both a crewed laboratory and an experimental testbed to demonstrate orbital rendezvous and docking capabilities during its two years of active operational life.

Launched uncrewed aboard a Long March 2F launch vehicle on 29 September 2011, it was the first operational component of the Tiangong program, which launched a larger, modular station into orbit in 2021. Tiangong-1 was initially projected to be deorbited in 2013, to be replaced over the following decade by the larger Tiangong-2 and Tiangong-3 space stations, but it orbited until 2 April 2018.

Tiangong-1 was visited by a series of Shenzhou spacecraft during its two-year operational lifetime. The first of these, the uncrewed Shenzhou 8, successfully docked with the module in November 2011, while the crewed Shenzhou 9 mission docked in June 2012. A third and final mission to Tiangong-1, the crewed Shenzhou 10, docked in June 2013. The crewed missions to Tiangong-1 were notable for including China's first female astronauts, Liu Yang and Wang Yaping.

On 21 March 2016, after a lifespan extended by two years, the China Manned Space Engineering Office announced that Tiangong-1 had officially ended its service. They went on to state that the telemetry link with Tiangong-1 had been lost. A couple of months later, amateur satellite trackers watching Tiangong-1 found that China's space agency had lost control of the station. In September 2016, after conceding they had lost control over the station, officials speculated that the station would re-enter and burn up in the atmosphere late in 2017. According to the China Manned Space Engineering Office, Tiangong-1 started reentry over the southern Pacific Ocean, northwest of Tahiti, on 2 April 2018 at 00:16 UTC.

Design and development 
The China National Space Administration (CNSA) designed Tiangong-1 as an  "space-laboratory module", capable of supporting the docking of crewed and autonomous spacecraft. In 2008, the China Manned Space Engineering Office (CMSEO) released a brief description of Tiangong-1, along with its larger successor modules, Tiangong-2 and Tiangong-3. A model of the space station was revealed in the Chinese Lunar New Year celebration program on CCTV on 25 January 2009.

On 29 September 2008, Zhang Jianqi, vice-director of the CMSEO, declared in an interview with China Central Television (CCTV) that Tiangong-1 would be launched in 2010 or 2011. Xinhua News Agency later stated that Tiangong-1 would be launched in late 2010, and declared that the renovation of ground equipment was in progress. However, the launch did not ultimately take place until 2011.

By mid-2011, the construction of Tiangong-1 was complete, and its systems and thermal properties were undergoing testing. Testing was also conducted on the Long March 2F launch vehicle on which Tiangong-1 would be launched. Technicians undertook particularly extensive safety tests on the launch vehicle  due to the recent launch failure of a Long March 2C launch vehicle.

Structure 
Structurally, Tiangong-1 was divided into two primary sections: a resource module, which mounted its solar panels and propulsion systems, and a larger, habitable experimental module.

Onboard facilities 
Tiangong-1's experimental module was equipped with exercise gear and two sleep stations. The interior walls of the spacecraft had a two-color paint scheme – one color representative of the ground, and the other representative of the sky. This was intended to help the astronauts maintain their orientation in zero gravity. High-resolution interior cameras allowed crewed missions to be closely monitored from the ground, and the two sleep stations had individual lighting controls. Toilet facilities and cooking equipment for the crewed missions were provided by the docked Shenzhou (spacecraft), rather than being integrated into the Tiangong module itself. Similarly, one member of the module's three-person crew slept in the Shenzhou spacecraft, preventing overcrowding.

Mission profile

Background 
Tiangong-1 was originally intended to be launched in August 2011, and was delivered to the Jiuquan Satellite Launch Center on 23 July 2011, successfully passing a launch rehearsal test on 17 August 2011. However, following the failed launch of a Long March 2C launch vehicle in August 2011, the launch was postponed. Following an investigation into the August 2011 launch failure, Tiangong-1's launch was rescheduled for late September 2011, partly to coincide with the Chinese National Day on 1 October 2011.

Launch 
On 20 September 2011, the spacecraft was again rolled out to Pad 1 of the South Launch Site at Jiuquan Satellite Launch Center in preparation for the rescheduled launch attempt. The launch occurred at 13:16 UTC on 29 September 2011, successfully placing Tiangong-1 into low Earth orbit. Chinese television broadcast the launch animation accompanied by an instrumental version of the American patriotic song America the Beautiful, a choice of music for which it later offered no explanation.

Orbital transfers and testing 
This was the precursor to a week-long program of orbital testing, conducted from the Beijing Aerospace Command and Control Center, to prepare the module for future orbital docking operations. On 10 October 2011, Tiangong-1 released its first orbital photo, showing a view of its outer hull and satellite relay antenna.

Autonomous orbital docking 

The uncrewed Shenzhou 8 mission successfully docked with Tiangong-1 on 2 November 2011 UTC, marking China's first orbital docking. Shenzhou 8 undocked from Tiangong-1 on 14 November 2011, before successfully completing a second rendezvous and docking, thus testing the reusability of the docking system. Shenzhou 8 deorbited on 17 November 2011, and landed intact in Siziwang Banner in Inner Mongolia. After the mission, the CNSA reported that Tiangong-1's systems were in optimal condition.

Crewed missions

Preparations 
In December 2011, the Tiangong-1 module began automated internal checks for toxic gas, to ensure that its interior would be safe for astronauts to enter. In January 2012, reports emerged in British publication Spaceflight alleging that the American Boeing X-37B robotic spaceplane was shadowing Tiangong-1 for surveillance purposes. However, former United States Air Force orbital analyst Brian Weeden later refuted this claim, emphasizing that the X-37B occupied a 100 degree right ascension offset orbit from Tiangong-1, and would not be able to closely observe the module as they would only pass each other twice an orbit at a closing speed of 7 km/s.

Shenzhou 9 (Expedition 1) 

In March 2012, it was reported that China had finished the initial crew selection for the Shenzhou 9 mission. Niu Hongguang, the deputy chief commander of the China Manned Space Engineering Office, stated that Shenzhou 9 would dock with Tiangong-1 before August 2012. The Shenzhou 9 spacecraft was delivered to Jiuquan Satellite Launch Center for launch preparations on 9 April 2012, while its Long March 2F launch vehicle arrived a month later on 9 May 2012.

Shenzhou 9 launched successfully on 16 June 2012, carrying with it China's first female astronaut, Liu Yang. The spacecraft docked with Tiangong-1 on 18 June 2012 at 06:07 UTC (14:07 Beijing time). After about three hours, when the air pressures inside the two vessels were equalized, mission commander Jing Haipeng entered Tiangong-1. The first docking was entirely computer-controlled, without input from the three astronauts; a second, crew-guided docking was successfully conducted on 24 June 2012 at 20:42 UTC (12:42 Beijing time). Shenzhou 9 landed safely in Inner Mongolia on 29 June 2012. In August 2012, Shenzhou 9's crew travelled to Hong Kong to discuss their mission with university students.

Shenzhou 10 (Expedition 2) 

The crewed Shenzhou 10 spacecraft, the final Shenzhou mission to rendezvous with Tiangong-1 before its deorbit, was launched on 11 June 2013. The launch of Shenzhou 10 was originally planned for earlier in the year, but was delayed to allow the mission to incorporate more complex scientific experiments. The mission's crew included China's second female astronaut, Wang Yaping. Shenzhou 10 docked successfully with Tiangong-1 on 13 June 2013.

On 15 June 2013, the Shenzhou 10 crew completed China's first orbital maintenance operation, replacing Tiangong-1's interior cladding. Additional maintenance work was conducted on the space station's seal rings. On 20 June 2013, Wang Yaping delivered a remote video lecture from orbit to students across China, demonstrating physics in microgravity with her colleagues. On 24 June 2013, CPC general secretary Xi Jinping contacted the astronauts via remote video link to congratulate them. After a series of successful docking tests, Shenzhou 10 undocked and returned safely to Earth on 26 June 2013. With a duration of 15 days, Shenzhou 10 was China's longest crewed space mission, until Shenzhou 11's 30-day mission to Tiangong-2 in 2016.

Post-mission 
The Tiangong-1 was launched in September 2011, with an intended service span of two years. After the last crew departed the module in June 2013, it was put into sleep mode. It was intended that it would remain in orbit for some time, allowing China to collect data on the longevity of key components before being commanded to gradually re-enter the atmosphere. The Permanent mission of China to the United Nations (Vienna) informed the United Nations Committee on the Peaceful Uses of Outer Space that communication with Tiangong-1 had ceased functioning on 16 March 2016. One week later on 21 March 2016, the China Manned Space Engineering Office announced that they had officially disabled data service and ended the mission. According to the office, the space laboratory was under continued and close monitoring until it finally burned up in the Earth's atmosphere during an uncontrolled re-entry.

Re-entry 

The orbit of Tiangong-1 decayed gradually, and the space laboratory was predicted to be destroyed upon re-entry into Earth's atmosphere.

At the request of China and the United Nations Office for Outer Space Affairs (UNOOSA), the Inter-Agency Space Debris Coordination Committee (IADC), led by the European Space Agency (ESA), conducted an international campaign to monitor the re-entry of Tiangong-1. ESA's Space Debris Office in Darmstadt, Germany hosted and administered the campaign, with participation from other space agencies and organizations including the China National Space Administration (CNSA), the Indian Space Research Organisation (ISRO), the Japan Aerospace Exploration Agency (JAXA), the Korea Aerospace Research Institute (KARI), and Roscosmos of Russia. The IADC predicted that Tiangong-1 would break up during re-entry, but that parts of the station would survive and fall to the Earth's surface, potentially falling across an area thousands of kilometres long and tens of kilometres wide. However, because most of the re-entry area was ocean or uninhabited land, the IADC stated that the odds of a person being hit by falling debris to be "10 million times smaller than the yearly chance of being hit by lightning". The IADC's final prediction before re-entry was that Tiangong-1 would re-enter at around 01:00 UTC on 2 April 2018, plus or minus 2 hours, falling somewhere on Earth between 42.8° North and 42.8° South latitudes, with the most likely re-entry sites being at the north and south extremes of that range. This is because an inclined orbit has the smallest north-south speed at the extreme latitudes, and the greatest north-south speed near the equator.

Independently, the non-profit Aerospace Corporation's Center for Orbital and Re-entry Debris Studies (CORDS) predicted that Tiangong-1 would most likely re-enter the atmosphere around 00:30 UTC on 2 April 2018, plus or minus 1.7 hours. CORDS scientists also predicted that it would re-enter somewhere between the 42.7° North and 42.7° South latitudes, a range that covered two-thirds of the Earth's surface, with a high likelihood of an ocean landing of whatever did not burn up during re-entry. They predicted that if any parts of the station survived re-entry, the small amount of debris would impact the ground over an area a few hundred square kilometers in size. The final prediction of likely areas for debris impact covered southern South America, Africa, the Middle East, and central Asia. However, even in those high-probability areas, they still estimated the odds of a specific person being hit by debris to be "about one million times smaller than the odds of winning the Powerball jackpot".

According to Chinese state news agency Xinhua, the station mostly burnt up upon re-entry. A fisherman from the nearby island of Maupiti was able to witness the event. It was the largest spacecraft to re-enter the atmosphere since Fobos-Grunt in January 2012. As the spacecraft made an uncontrolled reentry, this was an unintended coincidence.

Program developments 
Tiangong-1 was designed as a test bed for key technologies later used on another test station called Tiangong-2, which was launched on 15 September 2016. Both experimental space stations were short-lived and meant to test technologies and systems for the Tiangong space station, which is planned to be assembled from 2021 to 2022.

The design of Tianzhou, an automated cargo spacecraft intended to resupply the Tiangong space station, is based on Tiangong-1.

See also 

 Agena target vehicle
 Chinese space program
 Chinese women in space
 International Space Station
 List of space stations
 Salyut 1
 Skylab

References

External links 
 

2011 in China
Chinese space stations
Space stations
Spacecraft launched in 2011
Spacecraft which reentered in 2018
Tiangong program
Satellites in low Earth orbit